In music, Op. 39 stands for Opus number 39. Compositions that are assigned this number include:

 Alkan – Comme le vent
 Alkan – En rythme molossique
 Alkan – Le festin d'Ésope
 Alkan – Scherzo diabolico
 Brahms – 16 Waltzes
 Britten – Albert Herring
 Busoni – Piano Concerto
 Chopin – Scherzo No. 3
 Dvořák – Czech Suite
 Elgar – Pomp and Circumstance Marches
 Ginastera – Piano Concerto No. 2
 Hindemith – Cardillac
 Margaret – Befreit
 Mendelssohn – Drei Motetten
 Myaskovsky – Symphony No. 16
 Oswald – String Quartet No. 3
 Prokofiev – Quintet
 Rachmaninoff – Études-Tableaux, Op. 39
 Schumann – Liederkreis, Op. 39
 Sibelius – Symphony No. 1 in E minor